Adam Matuszczyk (born 14 February 1989) is a Polish footballer who plays for 1. FC Düren and was a member of the Poland national team. Naturally a left midfielder, he can also be deployed as a defensive midfielder.

Career
Matuszczyk began his career with SpVgg Merzig and later joined VfB Dillingen. After successful years with the youth teams of VfB Dillingen he was scouted by 1. FC Köln in the summer of 2003 and was promoted to the reserve team in the 2008–09 season. In the first half of the season, Matuszczyk earned 11 caps and, on 3 February 2009, was promoted to the Bundesliga team of 1. FC Köln. He made his Bundesliga debut on 27 February 2010 against Bayer Leverkusen. His first Bundesliga goals came on 10 April, when he scored twice to give Köln a 2–0 away win versus Hoffenheim. In January 2012, he was loaned to Fortuna Düsseldorf.

In May 2015, Matuszczyk signed a three-year contract with Eintracht Braunschweig. However, after the 2016–17 2. Bundesliga season, he transferred to Polish club Zagłębie Lubin.

On 16 June 2017, he signed a contract with Ekstraklasa side Zagłębie Lubin.

On 31 January 2019, Matuszczyk joined Uerdingen 05 on a short term deal.

International career
The former U-21 team player earned his first call up to the Poland national football team on 19 December 2009 for the King's Cup in Thailand. However, he was retained by his club due to the tournament's scheduling outside of the official FIFA calendar for international matches. On 4 May 2010, he was called up for the friendly games in May 2010. He made his international debut on 29 May 2010 against Finland. His first international goal came against the United States in October 2010.

Personal life
He was born in Gliwice, Poland and moved to Germany in 1991 at the age of two. Thus, he also has a German passport. He is married to wife Denise with whom he has a son, Lennox.

Born as Adam Matuszczyk, he is known in Germany as Adam Matuschyk.

Career statistics

Club

1.Includes promotion playoff.

International goals

|-
| 1. || 9 October 2010 || Soldier Field, Chicago, United States ||  || 1–1 || 2–2 || Friendly
|}

Honours
 Under 19 Bundesliga West: 2008

References

External links
 
 

1989 births
Living people
1. FC Köln players
1. FC Köln II players
Fortuna Düsseldorf players
Eintracht Braunschweig players
Zagłębie Lubin players
KFC Uerdingen 05 players
Polish footballers
Poland international footballers
Bundesliga players
2. Bundesliga players
Polish emigrants to Germany
Naturalized citizens of Germany
UEFA Euro 2012 players
Sportspeople from Gliwice
Poland under-21 international footballers
Association football midfielders
3. Liga players